The 1973 European Athletics Indoor Championships were held between 10 and 11 March 1973 in Rotterdam, Netherlands at the Ahoy arena.

The track used for the championships was 170 metres long.

Medal summary

Men

Women

Medal table

Participating nations

 (8)
 (12)
 (18)
 (19)
 (3)
 (27)
 (10)
 (28)
 (12)
 (3)
 (5)
 (1)
 (10)
 (20)
 (2)
 (30)
 (1)
 (6)
 (20)
 (10)
 (8)
 (3)
 (44)
 (4)

References

 Results - men at GBR Athletics
 Results - women at GBR Athletics
 Detailed results at Die Leichtatletik-Statistik-Seite
 EAA

 
European Athletics Indoor Championships
European Indoor Championships
Athletics, European Indoor
European Indoor
Sports competitions in Rotterdam
20th century in Rotterdam
March 1973 sports events in Europe